Georg Trašanov (born 18 November 1954) is an Estonian politician. 2003–2010 he served as the governor of Valga County.

References

1954 births
Living people
Estonian politicians
People convicted of bribery
People from Valga County
Estonian politicians convicted of crimes
Estonian University of Life Sciences alumni